Princess Cecylia Lubomirska (28 June 1907 – 20 September 2001) was a member of the House of Lubomirski by birth and a Princess of Bourbon-Two Sicilies through her marriage to Prince Gabriel of Bourbon-Two Sicilies.

Family
Cecylia was the second child and only daughter of Prince Kazimierz Lubomirski and his wife Countess Teresą Marią Matylda Wodzicką z Granowa. Through her father, Cecylia was a great-granddaughter of Count Andrzej Artur Zamoyski and a great-great-granddaughter of Count Stanisław Kostka Zamoyski.

Marriage and issue
Cecylia married Prince Gabriel of Bourbon-Two Sicilies, twelfth child and youngest son of Prince Alfonso of Bourbon-Two Sicilies, Count of Caserta and his wife Princess Antonietta of Bourbon-Two Sicilies, on 15 September 1932 in Kraków. Cecylia and Gabriel had four children:

Prince Jean Maria Casimir of Bourbon-Two Sicilies (born 30 June 1933 in Warsaw – died 25 December 2000 in Madrid)
Princess Maria Margarita Therese Antoinette Alfonsine Casimira of Bourbon-Two Sicilies (born 16 November 1934 in Warsaw – died 15 January 2014 in Madrid)
 ∞ Luis Gonzaga Maldonado y Gordon (born 17 November 1932 in Madrid) on 11 June 1962 in Jerez de la Frontera

Princess Marie Immaculata of Bourbon-Two Sicilies (born 25 June 1937 in Warsaw)
 ∞ Miguel Garcia de Saéz y Tellecea  (6 September 1921 – 12 March 1982) on 29 June 1970 in Sant Josep de sa Talaia; divorced in 1979

Prince Casimir of Bourbon-Two Sicilies (born 8 November 1938 in Warsaw)
 ∞ Princess Maria Cristina of Savoy  (born 12 September 1933 in Miramare) on 29 January 1967 in Jacarezinho
Prince Luís Alfonso of Bourbon-Two Sicilies (born 28 November 1970 in Rio de Janeiro)
∞ Christine Apovian (born 20 May 1969) on 22 October 1998 in São Paulo
Princess Anna Sophia of Bourbon-Two Sicilies (born 9 April 1999 in São Paulo)
Princess Anna Cecilia of Bourbon-Two Sicilies (born 24 December 1971 in São Paulo)
∞ Count Rodolphe de Causans (born 22 January 1973) civilly on 18 August 2005 in Les Verchers-sur-Layon, religiously on 19 September 2005 in Turin
Amedeo de Causans (born 8 May 2006)
Victoria de Causans (born 13 May 2009)
Princess Elena Sofia of Bourbon-Two Sicilies (born 10 September 1973 in São Paulo)
Prince Alexander Henrique of Bourbon-Two Sicilies (born 9 August 1974 in São Paulo)
Ordained a priest in Rome on 22 December 2007

Ancestry

References

1907 births
2001 deaths
Polish Roman Catholics
Princesses of Bourbon-Two Sicilies
Lubomirski family
Polish princesses
20th-century Roman Catholics
21st-century Roman Catholics